Aladin Saha Puduma Pahana is a 2018 Sri Lankan Sinhalese fantasy thriller film directed by Sumith Kumara and produced by Prasad Wijesuriya. It stars Dhananjaya Siriwardena and Udari Warnakulasooriya in lead roles along with Nethu Priyangika and D.B. Gangodathenna. Music composed by Ruvin Diaz. It is the 1308th Sri Lankan film in the Sinhalese cinema.

Plot

Cast
 Dhananjaya Siriwardena as Aladin
 Udari Warnakulasooriya as Princess 
 Nethu Priyangika as Nidiya, princess's servant 		
 D.B. Gangodathenna as Mashoor Pasha		
 Dilhara Rajapaksha as Fathima	
 Bindu Bothalegama as Suleiman, palace guard		
 Nimal Pallewatte as Ghost in the ring		
 Senaka Titus Anthony as Ghost in the lamp		
 Priyantha Mansilu as Hasan 		
 Rohitha Dias as Maha Amathi

Songs
The film contains two songs.

References

External links
 
 Alandin on YouTube
 Alandin on Facebook

2010s Sinhala-language films
2018 films